6-phospho-3-hexuloisomerase (3-hexulose-6-phosphate isomerase, phospho-3-hexuloisomerase, PHI, 6-phospho-3-hexulose isomerase, YckF) is an enzyme with systematic name D-arabino-hex-3-ulose-6-phosphate isomerase. This enzyme catalyses the following chemical reaction

 D-arabino-hex-3-ulose 6-phosphate  D-fructose 6-phosphate

This enzyme plays a key role in the ribulose-monophosphate cycle of formaldehyde fixation.

References

External links 
 

EC 5.3.1